The 1972 Atlantic Coast Conference men's basketball tournament was held in Greensboro, North Carolina, at the Greensboro Coliseum from March 9–11. North Carolina defeated Maryland, 73–64, to win the championship. Bob McAdoo of North Carolina was named the tournament MVP.  With the departure of South Carolina, the ACC was left with seven members, so the top seed received a bye into the semifinals from 1972 through and including 1979.

Bracket

References

Tournament
ACC men's basketball tournament
Basketball in North Carolina
College sports in North Carolina
Sports competitions in Greensboro, North Carolina
ACC men's basketball tournament
ACC men's basketball tournament